This is a list of all National Historic Landmarks designated by the U.S. government in Kansas.  There are 26 National Historic Landmarks (NHLs) in Kansas.

The United States National Historic Landmark program is operated under the auspices of the National Park Service, and recognizes structures, districts, objects, and similar resources according to a list of criteria of national significance.

The state of Kansas is home to 26 of these landmarks, illustrating the state's military and frontier heritage, as well as its contributions to the broader themes of the Civil Rights Movement, the Progressive Movement, and others.

National Historic Landmarks

|}

See also
List of U.S. National Historic Landmarks by state
National Register of Historic Places listings in Kansas
Historic preservation
National Register of Historic Places
History of Kansas

References

External links

National Historic Landmark Program at the National Park Service
Lists of National Historic Landmarks

Kansas
 
National Historic Landmarks
National Historic Landmarks